The SNCF Class BB 69400 is a class of diesel locomotives. These locomotives were originally BB 66400 locomotives, and were re-engined and overhauled, with their original number increased by 3000.

BB 69400
69400
Railway locomotives introduced in 1968
Standard gauge locomotives of France

Rebuilt locomotives 
Freight locomotives